Tales of an Ancient Empire is a 2010 American fantasy-sword and sorcery film directed by Albert Pyun and starring Kevin Sorbo, Michael Paré, Whitney Able, Melissa Ordway, Ralf Moeller, Lee Horsley, and Victoria Maurette. It is a sequel to Pyun's directorial debut, The Sword and the Sorcerer.

Synopsis
Queen Ma’at finds her kingdom of Abelar under attack when treasure seekers accidentally open the tomb of vampire queen Xia. The Queen sends her half-sister, Princess Tanis, to the outlaw city of Douras to find her real father so he can save the kingdom.

Meanwhile, servant girl Kara who shares the same father as Tanis, but her mother is Xia and discovers she (Xia) is really a vampire and begins hunting Tanis. Once in Douras, the Princess finds her half-brother Aedan  and convinces him to help her. Together they locate half-sister Malia, another half-sister Rajan and her daughter Alana. With this small group they plan to thwart vampire queen Xia.

Cast
 Kevin Sorbo as Aedan
 Michael Paré as Oda
 Whitney Able as Xia
 Melissa Ordway as Princess Tanis
 Sarah Ann Schultz as Malia
 Janelle Giumarra as Rajan 
 Inbar Lavi as Alana
 Jennifer Siebel Newsom as Queen Ma'at
 Ralf Moeller as General Hafez
 Matthew Willig as Giant Iberian
 Victoria Maurette as Kara
 Lee Horsley as Talon
 Sasha Mitchell as Rodrigo

Production
The sequel was first announced in 1982, in the end credits of The Sword and the Sorcerer. Production itself officially began with scriptwriting in November 2007, followed by principal photography in California the following year.  According to Pyun, actors considered for the film included Yancy Butler, Kari Wuhrer, Mark Dacascos, Val Kilmer, Steven Seagal, Olivier Gruner, and Christopher Lambert.

Release
The film's North American premiere was at the Fright Night Film Fest of July 2010 in Louisville, Kentucky. The film was released in the United States by Lionsgate in January 2012.

Reception
Bob Calhoun of Salon.com wrote that Sorbo "sinks to sad new lows" after starring in the film.

Scott Weinberg of Twitch Film called it "one of the worst films I've ever seen". Weinberg said that it is "the sort of movie that makes you reconsider Uwe Boll's status as the reigning king of movie crap".

eFilm critic Jack Sommersby rated the film one star and said: "What's infuriating is that Pyun has oodles of talent and can be a first-rate director when he allows himself to be guided by ratiocination rather than egregious grandeur. The Sword and the Sorcerer didn't exactly have the sturdiest of scripts, which resulted in a lumpy middle section, but it was all of a piece, a consistent visionfor my money, far better than John Boorman's clunky Excalibur from the year before". Nick Hartel of DVD Talk rated it 0/5 stars and also called Pyun worse than Boll, whom he called merely lazy rather than incompetent like Pyun.

Scott Pyle of Fulvue Drive-In.com writes: "Empire tries very hard to follow the happy-go-lucky spirit of its predecessor, and it manages to succeed at this on some level, but it lacks the innocence and pure fun of Sorcerer". David Johnson of DVD Verdict wrote that the film's only redeeming quality is that it is "laughably short".

Giving the film one star, Jason Rugart said: "I fear it will end up on my worst of list next December ... Pyun has an excellent eye for the visually intriguing and his love for the craft palpable. That's the thing that makes Tales such a frustrating viewing experience is that elements of a good movie or at least a watchable one are swimming about in this murky haphazard concoction".

References

2010 films
2010 fantasy films
2010 independent films
American fantasy films
American independent films
American sequel films
2010s English-language films
Films directed by Albert Pyun
American sword and sorcery films
American vampire films
Films shot in California
2010s American films